The 2019 Ando Securities Open was a professional tennis tournament played on outdoor hard courts. It was the fourth edition of the tournament which was part of the 2019 ITF Women's World Tennis Tour. It took place in Tokyo, Japan between 11 and 17 November 2019.

Singles main-draw entrants

Seeds

 1 Rankings are as of 4 November 2019.

Other entrants
The following players received wildcards into the singles main draw:
  Mai Minokoshi
  Yuriko Lily Miyazaki
  Ayumi Morita
  Yuuki Tanaka

The following players received entry from the qualifying draw:
  Naomi Cheong
  Nagi Hanatani
  Erina Hayashi
  Mai Hontama
  Eri Hozumi
  Makoto Ninomiya

The following player received entry as a lucky loser:
  Risa Ushijima

Champions

Singles

 Zhang Shuai def.  Jasmine Paolini, 6–3, 7–5

Doubles

 Choi Ji-hee /  Han Na-lae def.  Haruka Kaji /  Junri Namigata, 6–3, 6–3

References

External links
 2019 Ando Securities Open at ITFtennis.com
 Official website

2019 ITF Women's World Tennis Tour
2019 in Japanese tennis
November 2019 sports events in Japan